Sora (written: 天, 穹, 青空 or 曾良) is a unisex Japanese given name. Notable people with the name include:

People
, Japanese voice actress
Sora Fukuzumi (born 2002), Japanese professional footballer
, Japanese footballer
Sora Inoue (illustrator), known for Samurai Girl: Real Bout High School
, Japanese artist, singer-songwriter, voice actress, composer and producer
, Japanese poet
, Japanese footballer 
Sora Ma (born 1984), Malaysian born Singaporean actress
, Japanese footballer 
, Japanese professional skateboarder
, Japanese voice actress and singer
, stage name of Japanese AV idol, model, and media personality
, a virtual YouTuber affiliated with Hololive Production

Fictional characters
Sora (.hack), character from the Japanese multimedia project .hack
Sora (Kingdom Hearts), main character in the video game series Kingdom Hearts
Sora, one of the main characters of the anime No Game No Life
Sora Aoi (manga), character in the Japanese manga series Aki Sora
Sora Harewataru, character from the Japanese anime series Soaring Sky! Pretty Cure
Sora Harukawa, character from Ensemble Stars!
Sora Inoue, brother of Orihime Inoue, a character in the anime/manga series Bleach
Sora Kasugano, character from the Japanese visual novel Yosuga no Sora
Sora Naegino, character in the Japanese anime series Kaleido Star
Sora Sosuke, character in the video game Yandere Simulator
Sora Takenouchi, character in the Japanese anime series Digimon
Sora Takeuchi, character in the Japanese manga series Air Gear
Sora Perse, a character in the Japanese anime series Yu-Gi-Oh! Arc-V

See also
 Sola (disambiguation)
 Sora (disambiguation)

Japanese unisex given names